is a Michelin-starred Chinese restaurant in Minato, Tokyo.

History
The restaurant opened in February 2017. Its executive chef, previously worked at a Chinese restaurant  for ten years and a Japanese restaurant Nihonryori Ryugin for five years. Its owner is Ryoji Hayashi, who has been involved in another Tokyo-based Chinese restaurant Tousenkaku.

Reception
Sazenka was awarded its first two stars in late 2017. It was then awarded the third star in late 2020, becoming the first Chinese restaurant in Tokyo to hold three Michelin stars. The Tabelog Award gave the restaurant a gold medal in 2018, 2019, and 2021.

GQ Japan magazine gave Sazenka the Best Breakthrough Award in late 2017. The restaurant was also ranked twenty-third in 2019, twenty-ninth in 2020, and twelfth in 2021 in Asia's 50 Best Restaurants list. It was also ranked seventy-fifth in 2021 in the World's 50 Best Restaurants list.

References

Further reading

External links
 
  at Tabelog

2017 establishments in Japan
Michelin Guide starred restaurants in Japan
Restaurants established in 2017
Restaurants in Tokyo